Catherine Caro (born 5 February, 1995) is a women's field hockey player from the United States. Caro joined the United States national team in 2018, following success in the national junior team.

A resident of the Martinsville section of Bridgewater Township, New Jersey, Caro graduated from Bridgewater-Raritan High School in 2013.

Caro first represented the United States junior national team at the 2016 Junior Pan American Cup in Tacarigua, Trinidad and Tobago. From this tournament, the team qualified for the 2016 Junior World Cup, where Caro also represented the United States.

Caro debuted for the United States senior team in 2018 in a test series against the Netherlands.

References

1995 births
Living people
American female field hockey players
Bridgewater-Raritan High School alumni
People from Bridgewater Township, New Jersey
Sportspeople from Somerset County, New Jersey
21st-century American women